"Crazy Rap", also known as "Colt 45 and 2 Zig-Zags" or simply "Colt 45", is a song by American rapper Afroman. It was featured on his third album, Sell Your Dope, and was later included on his greatest hits album, The Good Times. It is often referred to as "Colt 45", as the hook states "Colt 45 and two Zig-Zags, baby that's all we need". The song failed to replicate the success of its predecessor but it nonetheless still charted across Europe, reaching the top 10 in the UK.

Track listing
 "Crazy Rap"
 "Crazy Rap" (Accapella)
 "Crazy Rap" (Afrolicious Mix)
 "Outro"

Music video
The video takes place in front of a liquor store in Los Angeles, and shows Afroman telling his story to his friends, while dancing and crip walking to the beat with them, and others who join in. It also shows him in the various situations he describes, such as riding in a car, being chased by a klansman, and multiple sexual encounters with women, some of which include a green-haired transgender woman from Hollywood, California, and another woman whom he seemingly cannot please, until her boyfriend walks in on them, and violently beats Afroman as retaliation for having an affair with his girlfriend. The last line is a homage to "Rapper's Delight".

This is a remade version of the song which was first featured on Afroman's debut album My Fro-losophy, which was released independently without a record label.

Charts

Weekly charts

Year-end charts

References

2001 singles
Afroman songs
Songs about cannabis
Dirty rap songs
2000 songs